Trondheim Cathedral School (Latin: Schola Cathedralis Nidrosiensis) is an upper secondary school located next to the Nidaros Cathedral in the center of Trondheim, Norway.

History
There is great dispute regarding the actual founding date of the Trondheim Cathedral, but the most common theory is that the school was founded in approximately 1152 and is hence the oldest school in Norway. The oldest part of the present school is the Harsdorff building (Munkegata 8), which was completed in 1786. The building is named after its designer Caspar Harsdorff,  a royal Danish architect. Originally though, the school's design was submitted by a local architect/organist/fireman, but upon review by the Danish king it was turned down and his royal architect assigned with designing the school. It was funded by Thomas Angell (1692–1767), a Trondheim merchant. Festival Hall on the second floor has two marble reliefs by noted Danish sculptor Bertel Thorvaldsen (1770–1844). In 1920, the school underwent a major expansion, with buildings designed by Norwegian architect Carl J. Moe (1889–1942).

Programs

Trondheim Cathedral School offers three programs: study specialized education programs, education programs for music, dance and drama as well as media and communication. The school has a separate dance and music program, offers Latin courses and the IB Diploma course for local students who want to travel abroad or for international students who move to the city. The school is part of UNESCO's Associated Schools Project Network (ASPnet.) In addition, the school has an international program, where the study course is structured so that students take the first and the third school year at Trondheim Cathedral School, while they have taken their second school year in Norfolk, England.

Notable alumni

Håkon Håkonson (1204–1263), king of Norway
Peter Wessel Tordenskiold (1690–1720), naval hero
Gerhard Schøning (1722–1780), Norwegian historian
Johan Nordahl Brun (1745–1816), bishop and poet
Gabriel Kielland (1871–1960), architect, painter, and designer
Carl Gustav Fleischer (1883–1942), general during World War II
Martin Linge (1894–1941), officer during World War II
Reidar Stavseth (1907–1991), editor and politician
Gudmund Hernes (born 1941), politician
Idun Reiten (born 1942), mathematician
Odd Einar Dørum (born 1943), politician
Jon Bing (born 1944), writer
Sigurd Allern (born 1946), professor of journalism
Trond Giske (born 1966), politician 
Erlend Loe (born 1969), novelist
Snorre Valen (born 1984), politician

See also
 List of the oldest schools in the world

External links
Alumni of Trondheim Cathedral School

References
 Due, Erichsen & Øverås: Trondheim Katedralskoles Historie 1152 - 1952 (Trondheim: 1952)

Secondary schools in Norway
Cathedral schools
International Baccalaureate schools in Norway
Education in Trondheim
Buildings and structures in Trondheim
Educational institutions established in the 12th century
Trøndelag County Municipality
1152 establishments in Europe
12th-century establishments in Norway